Acalyphes is a monotypic moth genus in the family Geometridae. Its single species, Acalyphes philorites, is found in Australia, where it feeds on pencil pine (Athrotaxis cupressoides). Both the genus and species were first described by Alfred Jefferis Turner in 1926

References

Archiearinae
Geometridae genera
Monotypic moth genera